James Winright Flanagan (September 5, 1805September 28, 1887) was an American merchant, lawyer, and farmer from Henderson, Texas. Although never officially inaugurated, he briefly served as the Lieutenant Governor of Texas in 1870, before leaving the position to represent Texas in the United States Senate from 1870 to 1875.

Early life
James was born to Charles and Elizabeth (Saunders) Flanagan in Albemarle County near Gordonsville, Virginia. Before his tenth birthday, the family moved to Boonesboro, Kentucky. As a young man he moved to Cloverport, Kentucky, on the Ohio River and became a prosperous merchant.  He also read law and was admitted to the Kentucky bar in 1825. He married Polly Moorman in 1826 and the couple had several children before moving to Henderson, Texas, in 1844.

Career
Flanagan established himself in Henderson by opening a store. He bought a farm, speculated in land, and practiced law. Politically, he was a Whig and an active supporter of Sam Houston. He later became a moderate Republican. Flanagan served in the Texas House of Representatives (1851–1852) and the Texas State Senate (1855–1858).

When the Civil War came to Texas, Flanagan was a Unionist, but he withdrew to his farm and lived quietly. He returned to active politics during the Reconstruction. He served as a delegate to both Constitutional Conventions. The first, in 1866, produced a state constitution that was rejected by the Radical Republicans in the U.S. Congress. The second, in 1868–1869, was successful.

Under the new Constitution, Flanagan was elected as Lieutenant Governor in 1869. He only held the position for a month, from January to February of 1870. When Texas was readmitted to the Union, the legislature named him, along with Morgan Hamilton, to the U.S. Senate. He served one term as a Senator, until 1875 when he was replaced by the Democrat Samuel Maxey. In the Senate he was a supporter of the Grant Administration.

Later life
After his Senate term, Flanagan took up residence on one of his farms near Longview, Texas. He married again (he was widowed twice and married three times), this time to Elizabeth Lane. The three marriages produced a total of eleven children. One of Flanagan’s children was David Webster Flanagan who also served as Lieutenant Governor in Texas.

Flanagan died on his farm in Longview in 1887 and was buried next to his first wife, Polly, in their family graveyard in Henderson, Texas.

External links
Biographic sketch at U.S. Congress website
 

1805 births
1887 deaths
People from Albemarle County, Virginia
American people of Irish descent
Republican Party United States senators from Texas
Lieutenant Governors of Texas
Republican Party Texas state senators
People from Longview, Texas
19th-century American politicians
American lawyers admitted to the practice of law by reading law
People from Breckinridge County, Kentucky